Oviglio (Ovij or J'Oij in Piedmontese) is a comune (municipality) in the Province of Alessandria in the Italian region Piedmont, located about  southeast of Turin and about  southwest of Alessandria.

Oviglio borders the following municipalities: Alessandria, Bergamasco, Borgoratto Alessandrino, Carentino, Castellazzo Bormida, Felizzano, Incisa Scapaccino, Masio, and Solero.

Demographic evolution

References